The plane of the solar system may refer to:

the plane of the Ecliptic;
the Invariable plane.